Dragan Vukoja (born 11 March 1969) is a retired Croatian football player and current manager of Dugopolje.

Club career
Vukoja spent most of his career playing in Croatia and Italy. In Croatia he played with Osijek, Belišće and Hrvatski Dragovoljac. In Italy he played for Foggia, Salernitana, Genoa and Pescara. Vukoja also spent three seasons in China where he played with Sichuan and Qingdao. He retired in 2004.

References

External links
 

1969 births
Living people
People from Nova Varoš
Croats of Serbia
Association football forwards
Croatian footballers
NK Osijek players
NK Belišće players
NK Hrvatski Dragovoljac players
Calcio Foggia 1920 players
U.S. Salernitana 1919 players
Genoa C.F.C. players
Delfino Pescara 1936 players
Sichuan Guancheng players
Qingdao Hainiu F.C. (1990) players
Croatian Football League players
Serie A players
Serie B players
Chinese Super League players
Croatian expatriate footballers
Expatriate footballers in Italy
Expatriate footballers in China
Croatian expatriate sportspeople in Italy
Croatian expatriate sportspeople in China
Croatian football managers
NK Dugopolje managers